LP Duo is a Serbian piano and electronic duo composed of pianists Sonja Lončar and Andrija Pavlović.
Formed as a traditional chamber ensemble performing classical music, the duo is now active in the fields of electronic, avant-garde, film, television, theater and popular music, both as performers and composers. More recently, LP Duo has been particularly involved with Quantum Music, an experimental genre that seeks to explore the connections between quantum physics and music.

History
The duo was formed in 2004, while Sonja Lončar and Andrija Pavlović studied at the piano department of the Faculty of Music in Belgrade, where they earned degrees in piano performance. The two then went on to study at the Rostock University of Music and Theatre. During this formative period, LP Duo performed a classical repertoire, including works of composers such as Johann Sebastian Bach and Wolfgang Amadeus Mozart, as well as avant-garde works by John Cage, Karlheinz Stockhausen, and Olivier Messiaen.

They were also greatly influenced by various popular genres, most notably trip hop and punk, and performers such as Kate Bush, Massive Attack, Portishead and Tricky, who inspired them to embark on an exploration of electronic music.

Since the mid-2000s, Lončar and Pavlović have performed frequently, both as a duo and individually, as soloists, and with renowned orchestras, such as the Belgrade Philharmonic Orchestra, the Symphony Orchestra of the Radio Television of Serbia and the Orchestra of the National Theater in Belgrade.

LP Duo often premieres compositions by avant-garde composers, many of whom have dedicated their works to the duo. These are mostly Serbian composers (Ivan Božičević, Miloš Raičković, Milimir Drašković, Miroslav Savić, Ana Sokolović) but also Danish composer Kim Helweg.

To date, they have released seven standalone albums and participated in several other releases. Their most recent album has been released in collaboration with Universal Music Serbia.

Featured activities

Theater, television and film music
LP Duo is very active in the fields of theater and visual arts. They have composed and performed music for theaters Atelje 212, National Theater in Belgrade, Yugoslav Drama Theater, Belgrade International Theatre Festival, Pinokio Puppet Theater, Duško Radović Theater, National Theatre Sombor, National Theatre Kikinda, Celje City Theatre and others.

They have written music for the TV series Žigosani u reketu by Dragan Bjelogrlić, Dug moru by Goran Gajić and Jutro će promeniti sve by Goran Stanković and Vladimir Tagić. They performed the closing track of the film Ederlezi Rising written by composer Nemanja Mosurović.

Quantum Music and Hybrid Piano 
Since 2012, LP Duo has been one of the key promoters of the Quantum Music concept. The Quantum Music project began with the reunion of two high school friends: one of the world's most famous quantum physicists, Vlatko Vedral (University of Oxford), and engineer and acoustician Dragan Novković, with the support of the Institute of Musicology of the Serbian Academy of Sciences and Arts, while the financing was provided by the Creative Europe program of the European Union.

Quantum physicists Andrew Garner and Klaus Molmer and composer Kim Helweg who joined the project at the invitation of LP Duo also contributed to the project, as well as musicologist Ivana Medić, who is also the project coordinator, while LP Duo are the lead artists and composers. In the preparatory phase, the duo members, together with engineers Dragan Novković and Darko Lazović, worked on the development of a special keyboard instrument, the so-called hybrid piano, which allows any existing acoustic piano to be connected to a computer. Thus LP Duo created a brand new instrument that combines piano and synthesizer sound; when performing individual tracks within the multimedia concert Quantum Music, they used sound samples based on algorithms, equations, and quantum physics formulas.

During the project implementation phase, the duo toured numerous European and global cities, such as Singapore, The Hague, Ljubljana, Aarhus and Copenhagen.
Thanks to the invention of the new hybrid piano sound, LP Duo has composed an album of original music called "Duality" (2019), released with Universal Music, which promotes the album in collaboration with Deutsche Grammophon, Yellow Lounge and IMG Artists at concerts across Europe, North America and Asia.

New Art Center 
LP Duo is the founder of the non-governmental organization New Art Center (2008), which is involved with various music projects and activities, including publishing sheet music in print and digital formats.

LP Elektro 
LP Elektro can be seen as the alter ego of LP Duo; it emerged as a result of more than two decades of the duo members’ collaborations with various rock and pop bands. LP Elektro combines different types of synthesizers, sophisticated electronic sounds and a wealth of rhythms with conceptual and love lyrics. Under this brand, LP Elektro released the album We Have To Talk (2019).

Discography and filmography

Albums

As LP Duo
LP Duo Plays Works For Two Pianos By Kim Helweg, Helikon Records, 2012.
Belgrade New Classics For Two Pianos (LP Duo Plays Composers From Belgrade), New Art Center, 2013.
Mechanical Destruction, Analogue Synth Symphony (LP Duo Plays Correa, Helweg, Mellits, Ligeti on Analogue Synths), New Art Center, 2016.
LP Duo Plays Music by the Composers From Serbia For Two Pianos, New Art Center, 2017.
A Place Of Coolness (LP Duo Plays Chiel Meijering), Donemus and New Art Center, 2017.
Duality, Universal Music Serbia, 2019.
Dead Sea, LP Duo, under exclusive license to Universal Music d.o.o., 2022.

As LP Elektro
We Have To Talk, Universal Music Serbia, 2019.

Other
Ivo Josipović, Ivana Stefanović, Composers’ Dialogue (composition "Dernek For Two Pianos Or Two Harpsichords, Percussion And Strings"), Cantus, 2009 – Listed as Andrija Pavlović and Sonja Lončar, in ensemble with Ivan Marjanović and Ivana Bilić. Composed by Ivo Josipović.

Series
Žigosani u reketu, 2018
Jutro će promeniti sve, 2018
Dug moru, 2019

Movies
Ederlezi Rising [A.I. Rising], 2018

References

External links
 
 LP Duo on Spotify
 LP Duo on iTunes

Serbian classical music groups
Serbian electronic music groups